Boothstown and Ellenbrook is an electoral ward of Salford, England. The ward was created in 2004 following recommendations made by the Boundary Committee for England. It is represented in Westminster by Barbara Keeley MP for Worsley and Eccles South. The 2011 Census recorded a population of 9,532.
Following extensive boundary changes to wards across the City of Salford, Boothstown and Ellenbrook was expanded to include the village of Roe Green. These new boundaries were first contested on 6 May 2021 in all-out elections, requiring all three ward councillors to stand for re-election.

Councillors 

The ward is represented by three councillors:

 Les Turner (Con)
 Darren Ward (Con)
 Bob Clarke (Con)

 indicates seat up for re-election.

Elections in 2020s

May 2021 

Boundary changes in wards across the City of Salford meant that all three councillors in each ward were required to stand for re-election in the May 2020 poll, although this was postponed for one year due to the Covid-19 pandemic.

Elections in 2010s

May 2019

May 2018

May 2016

May 2015

May 2014

May 2012

May 2011

May 2010

Elections in 2000s

References 

Salford City Council Wards